Nguyễn Thị Liễu (born 18 September 1992) is a Vietnamese footballer who plays as a midfielder club Phong Phú Hà Nam and Vietnam women's national football team.

International goals

External links 
 

1992 births
Living people
Women's association football midfielders
Vietnamese women's footballers
Vietnam women's international footballers
Asian Games competitors for Vietnam
Footballers at the 2014 Asian Games
Footballers at the 2018 Asian Games
Southeast Asian Games gold medalists for Vietnam
Southeast Asian Games medalists in football
Competitors at the 2017 Southeast Asian Games
Competitors at the 2019 Southeast Asian Games
Southeast Asian Games silver medalists for Vietnam
Competitors at the 2013 Southeast Asian Games
21st-century Vietnamese women